This list of notable LGBT YouTubers includes YouTubers who publicly identify as lesbian, gay, bisexual, transgender or otherwise part of the LGBT community.

List 

{| class="wikitable sortable"
!Name
!Nationality
!Orientation(s) & identification(s)
!Associated channels
!Ref.
|-
|Abigail Thorn
|British
|Lesbian, transgender
|Philosophy Tube, Philosophy Tube Live
|
|-
|Alex Bertie
|British
|Transgender, pansexual
|TheRealAlexBertie
|
|-
|Andrea Russett
|American
|Bisexual
|Andrea Russett
|
|-
|Anna Akana
|American
|Queer, bisexual
|Anna Akana
|
|-
|Anna Brisbin
|American
|Bisexual
|Brizzy Voices, BrizzyVlogs
|
|-
|Austin Show
|American
|Gay, bisexual
|Austinshow, AustinShow Clips
|
|-
|Ben J. Pierce
|American
|Gay, queer
|BennySounds, KidPOV, MISS BENNY
|
|-
|Blaire White
|American
|Transgender
|Blaire White
|
|-
|Brandon Rogers
|American
|Gay
|Brandon Rogers
|
|-
|Brendan Jordan
|American
|Genderfluid
|Brendan Jordan
|
|-
|Bria Kam
|American
|Lesbian
|BriaAndChrissy, briakam
|
|-
|Bryan Odell
|American
|Queer
|BryanStars
|
|-
|Calum McSwiggan
|British
|Gay
|eatgaylove
|
|-
|Chris Stuckmann
|American
|Pansexual
|Chris Stuckmann
|
|-
|Chrissy Chambers
|American
|Lesbian
|BriaAndChrissy, Lesbian Love
|
|-
|Connie Glynn
|British
|Aromantic, lesbian
|Connie Glynn, Connie
|
|-
|Connor Franta
|American
|Gay
|ConnorFranta, More Connor, our2ndlife
|
|-
|Daniel Howell
|British
|Queer, gay
|Daniel Howell, danisnotinteresting, DanAndPhilGAMES
|
|-
|Davey Wavey
|American
|Gay
|Wickydkewl
|
|-
|David K. Smith
|British
|Gay
|ProfessorDaveatYork
|
|-
|Dodie Clark
|British
|Bisexual
|doddleoddle, doddlevloggle, dodieVEVO
|
|-
|Doug Armstrong
|British
|Gay
|Epiphanized, Doug's Life
|
|-
|Elijah Daniel
|American
|Gay
|Elijah Daniel, Elijah and Christine, Elijah & Christine etc
|
|-
|Eugene Lee Yang
|American
|Gay
|The Try Guys
|
|-
|Eva Gutowski
|American
|Bisexual
|MyLifeAsEva, VLOGTOWSKI
|
|-
|Evan Edinger
|American-British
|Asexual
|Evan Edinger, Evan Edinger Travel
|
|-
|Gigi Gorgeous
|Canadian
|Pansexual, transgender
|Gigi Gorgeous
|
|-
|Gregory Brown
|Canadian
|Gay
|AsapSCIENCE, Greg and Mitch
|
|-
|Hannah Hart
|American
|Lesbian
|My Drunk Kitchen, MyHarto, yourharto
|
|-
|Harry Brewis
|British
|Bisexual
|Hbomberguy, Hbomberguy Live
|
|-
|Hazel Hayes
|Irish
|Bisexual
|Hazel Hayes
|
|-
|Ian Kochinski
|American
|Pansexual
|Vaush, The Vaush Pit
|
|-
|Ingrid Nilsen
|American
|Lesbian
|Ingrid Nilsen
|
|-
|Issa Twaimz
|American
|Gay
|twaimz
|
|-
|Jacob Rabon
|American
|Bisexual
|Alpharad
|
|-
|Jack Baran
|American
|Gay
|thatsojack
|
|-
|Jaiden Dittfach
|American
|Asexual, aromantic
|Jaiden Animations
|
|-
|James Charles
|American
|Gay
|James Charles
|
|-
|Jamie Raines
|British
|Transgender, bisexual
|Jammidodger
|
|-
|Javier Ramírez
|Colombian
|Gay
|Javier Ramírez
|
|-
|Jazz Jennings
|American
|Transgender, pansexual
|Jazz Jennings
|
|-
|Jeffree Star
|American
|Bisexual, androgynous
|Jeffree Star
|
|-
|Jeffrey Marsh
|American
|Genderqueer
|Official Jeffrey Marsh
|
|-
|Jenn McAllister
|American
|Bisexual
|jennxpenn
|
|-
|Jessica Kellgren-Fozard
|British
|Lesbian
|Jessica Kellgren-Fozard
|
|-
|James Stephanie Sterling
|British
|Pansexual, Non-binary
|Jim Sterling
|
|-
|Jimmy Fowlie
|American
|Gay
|jimmyfowlie
|
|-
|Jimmy Hill
|British
|Gay
|jimmy0010, Cereal Time
|
|-
|Joey Graceffa
|American
|Gay
|Joey Graceffa
|
|-
|JoJo Siwa
|American
|Queer, pansexual
|Its JoJo Siwa
|
|-
|Jon Cozart
|American
|Bisexual
|Paint
|
|-
|Julie Sondra Decker
|American
|Asexual, aromantic
|swankivy
|
|-
|Kat Blaque
|American
|Transgender
|Kat Blaque, Kat Blaque Rants
|
|-
|Keara Graves
|Canadian
|Queer
|Keara Graves
|
|-
|Laci Green
|American
|Pansexual
|lacigreen
|
|-
|Larri Merritt
|American
|Gay
|LARRAY
|
|-
|Lasizwe Dambuza
|South African
|Gay
|Lasizwe Dambuza
|
|-
|Lilly Singh
|Canadian
|Bisexual
|Lilly Singh, Lilly Singh Vlogs
|
|-
|Lindsay Ellis
|American
|Bisexual
|Lindsay Ellis
|
|-
|Lloyd Cadena
|Filipino
|Gay
|Lloyd Cafe Cadena
|
|-
|Lucas Cruikshank
|American
|Gay
|FЯED, Lucas, More Lucas
|
|-
|mxmtoon
|American
|Bisexual
|mxmtoon
|
|-
|Manuel Gutierrez
|American
|Gay
|Manny Mua
|
|-
|Max Emerson
|American
|Gay
|max emerson
|
|-
|Max Miller
|American
|Gay
|Tasting History
|
|-
|Meg Turney
|American
|Bisexual
|Meg Turney
|
|-
|Mia Mulder
|Swedish
|Transgender, Bisexual
|Mia Mulder
|
|-
|Michael Buckley
|American
|Pansexual
|Buck Hollywood, The New Michael Buckley Channel
|
|-
|Mikey Bustos
|Canadian-Filipino
|Bisexual
|MikeyBustosVideos, MikeyBustosVLOGS, Mikey Bustos Music
|
|-
|Miles McKenna
|American
|Transgender
|MilesChronicles
|
|-
|Mitch Grassi
|American
|Gay
|PTXOfficial, SUPERFRUIT
|
|-
|Mitchell Moffit
|Canadian
|Gay
|AsapSCIENCE, Greg and Mitch, Mitchell Moffit
|
|-
|Natalie Wynn
|American
|Transgender, lesbian
|ContraPoints, ContraPointsLive
|
|-
|Nicholas Perry
|Ukrainian-American
|Gay
|Nikocado Avocado
|
|-
|Niki Albon
|British
|Gay
|Niki and Sammy
|
|-
|Nikita Dragun
|American
|Transgender
|Nikita Dragun
|
|-
|Nikkie de Jager
|Dutch
|Transgender
|NikkieTutorials
|
|-
|Pedro Luis Joao
|Venezuelan
|Gay
|La Divaza
|
|-
|Phil Lester
|British
|Gay
|AmazingPhil, LessAmazingPhil, DanAndPhilGAMES
| 
|-
| Rickey Thompson
| American
| Gay
| Rickey Thompson, Rickey Thompson Vlogs
| 
|-
|Ricky Dillon
|American
|Gay
|Ricky Dillon
|
|-
|Rose Ellen Dix
|British
|Lesbian
|Rose Ellen Dix, TheRoxetera, Let's Play Games
|
|-
|Rosie Spaughton
|British
|Bisexual
|TheRoxetera, Let's Play Games
|
|-
|Ryland Adams
|American
|Gay
|Ryland Adams
|
|-
|Sam Tsui
|American
|Gay
|TheSamTsui
|
|-
|Scott Hoying
|American
|Gay
|PTXOfficial, SUPERFRUIT
|
|-
|Shane Dawson
|American
|Bisexual
|Shane, Shane Dawson TV, Human Emoji
|
|-
|Shannon Beveridge
|American
|Lesbian
|Nowthisisliving
|
|-
|Shaylee Curnow
|Australian
|Lesbian
|Peach PRC
|
|-
|Skylar Kergil
|American
|Transgender
|skylarkeleven
|
|-
|Stef Sanjati
|Canadian
|Transgender
|Stef Sanjati
|
|-
|Steven Kenneth Bonnell II
|American
|Bisexual
|Destiny
|
|-
|Tana Mongeau
|American
| Pansexual
|Tana Mongeau
|
|-
|Thomas Sanders
|American
|Gay
|Thomas Sanders, Roxas424, Thomas Sanders and Friends
|
|-
|TJ Kirk
|American
|Bisexual
|TJ Kirk, The Drunken Peasants Podcast, Deep Fat Fried
|
|-
|Todrick Hall
|American
|Gay
|todrickhall
|
|-
|Trevi Moran
|American
|Transgender
|Trevi Moran, our2ndlife
|
|-
|Trisha Paytas
|American
|Non-binary
|blndsundoll4mj, Trisha Paytas
|
|-
|Trixie Mattel
|American
|Gay
|Trixie Mattel
|
|-
|Troye Sivan
|Australian-South African
|Gay
||Troye Sivan, TroyeSivanVEVO
|
|-
|Tuure Boelius
|Finnish
|Gay
|Tuure Boelius
|
|-
|Tyler Oakley
|American
|Gay
|Tyler Oakley, extratyler
|
|-
|Vivienne Medrano
|American
|Bisexual
|Vivziepop, xZoOPhobiAX
|  
|-
|Willam Belli
|American
|Gay
|Willam Belli
|
|}

References

YouTubers
Lists of 21st-century people
YouTubers